Stasys Eidrigevičius (born 24 July 1949 in Mediniškiai, Lithuania) is a painter and graphic artist.

Biography
Eidrigevičius graduated from the College of Fine Arts and Crafts in Kaunas in 1968. In 1973, he obtained a diploma from Vilnius Academy of Fine Arts. Since 1980 he has lived in Poland. Eidrigevičius is active in many artistic fields, such as: oil painting, book-plate, book illustration, studio graphics, and photography. He has been interested in posters since 1984.

Major awards
Major awards: Gold Plaque for children's book illustration at Biennial of Book Art in Bratislava, Czechoslovakia (1979, 1981, 1989), Grand Prix (1991); Gold Medal at International Biennial of Exlibris in Malbork (1980); Honorary Mention at Exhibition of Small Graphic Forms in Łódź, Poland (1979); Grand Prix for book illustration in Barcelona, Spain (1986); Grand Prix at International Biennial of Posters in Lahti, Finland (1989); 3rd Prize at International Biennial of Posters in Warsaw (1990), Gold Medal, Toyama, Japan (1994), 1st Prize at Biennial of Polish Poster, Katowice (1999), National Award in Arts, Lithuania (2001); Commander's Cross of the Order of Merit of the Republic of Poland (2019).

References

1949 births
Living people
Lithuanian graphic designers
Lithuanian illustrators
Lithuanian painters
Lithuanian photographers
Soviet emigrants to Poland
Polish graphic designers
20th-century Polish painters
20th-century Polish male artists
21st-century Polish painters
21st-century male artists
Polish photographers
Polish poster artists
Recipients of the Lithuanian National Prize
Recipients of the Silver Medal for Merit to Culture – Gloria Artis
Commanders of the Order of Merit of the Republic of Poland
Polish male painters